Caenides dacenilla, the no-spot recluse, is a species of butterfly in the family Hesperiidae. It is found in Ivory Coast, Ghana, Nigeria (the Cross River loop) and Cameroon. The habitat consists of dense forest.

References

Butterflies described in 1925
Hesperiinae